Blake Richard Sloan (born July 27, 1975) is an American former professional ice hockey player who played six seasons in the National Hockey League (NHL). He played right wing during the first half of his career and moved to defense when he started playing in the German Deutsche Eishockey Liga.

Playing career
As a youth, Sloan played in the 1988 Quebec International Pee-Wee Hockey Tournament with the Chicago Young Americans minor ice hockey team.

Sloan played for the University of Michigan from 93–96 and won the NCAA championship in 1996. He also was awarded the Humanitarian Award in 1996–97, given annually to the player judged "college hockey's finest citizen."

Sloan started his NHL career with the Dallas Stars in 1999. He started the 1998–99 season in the minor leagues with the Houston Aeros.  At a game where Dallas Stars scouts were their check on other players, Sloan caught the eye of the Stars and promptly acquired him. He won a Stanley Cup with Dallas in 1999. His determination and effort earned him the nickname "The Caffeinated Squirrel", by Dallas Stars broadcaster Daryl Reaugh.

He also played with the Calgary Flames and Columbus Blue Jackets.  In 2005–06, he played in Sweden's Elitserien for Timrå IK.

For the 2006–07season, Sloan signed to play in Germany for Adler Mannheim in the Deutsche Eishockey Liga. Blake contributed to immediate success, winning the DEL championship that season.

After three seasons in Mannheim, on July 23, 2009 he signed a one-year deal to captain fellow DEL team, the Grizzly Adams Wolfsburg. In the ensuing 2009–10 season, Sloan recorded his best German season to score 26 points in 55 games. On April 20, 2010, Sloan agreed to a one-year extension to remain in Wolfsburg.

On July 6, 2012, as a free agent after his third season with the Grizzly Adams, Sloan signed a one-year contract with EHC München.

Career statistics

Regular season and playoffs

International

Awards and honors

References

External links

1975 births
Living people
Adler Mannheim players
American men's ice hockey defensemen
American men's ice hockey right wingers
Calgary Flames players
Columbus Blue Jackets players
Dallas Stars players
EHC München players
Grizzlys Wolfsburg players
Grand Rapids Griffins players
Houston Aeros (1994–2013) players
Ice hockey people from Chicago
Michigan Wolverines men's ice hockey players
Stanley Cup champions
Timrå IK players
Undrafted National Hockey League players
Tabor Academy (Massachusetts) alumni
NCAA men's ice hockey national champions